Use Me may refer to:

 "Use Me" (Bill Withers song), 1972 song by Bill Withers
 "Use Me" a 1994 gospel song on that appears on God Is Able (Ron Kenoly album)
 "Use Me" a 2002 song by Garbage that was the B-side for some editions of their "Cherry Lips" single
 "Use Me" (Kid Courageous song), 2005 song by Kid Courageous
 "Use Me" (Hinder song), 2008 song by Hinder
 Use Me (David Bromberg album), a 2011 album by David Bromberg
 Use Me (Pvris album), a 2020 album by Pvris
 "Use Me", a song by Future on his album Hndrxx (2017)